|}

This is a list of electoral division results for the Australian 1906 federal election.

New South Wales

Barrier

Calare

Cook

Cowper

Dalley

Darling

East Sydney

Eden-Monaro

Gwydir

Hume

Hunter

Illawarra

Lang

Macquarie

Nepean

Newcastle

New England

North Sydney

Parkes

Parramatta

Richmond

Riverina

Robertson

South Sydney

Wentworth

Werriwa

West Sydney

Victoria

Balaclava

Ballaarat

Batman

Bendigo

Bourke

Corangamite

Corio

Echuca

Fawkner

Flinders

Gippsland

Grampians

Indi

Kooyong

Laanecoorie

Maribyrnong

Melbourne

Melbourne Ports

Mernda

Wannon

Wimmera

Yarra

Queensland

Brisbane

Capricornia

Darling Downs

Herbert

Kennedy

Maranoa

Moreton

Oxley

Wide Bay

South Australia

Adelaide

Angas

Barker

Boothby

Grey

Hindmarsh

Wakefield

Western Australia

Coolgardie

Fremantle

Kalgoorlie

Perth

Swan

Tasmania

Bass

Darwin

Denison

Franklin

Wilmot

See also 

 1906 Australian federal election
 Candidates of the 1906 Australian federal election
 Members of the Australian House of Representatives, 1906–1910
 Members of the Australian Senate, 1907–1910

Notes

References 

House of Representatives 1906